Mallén is a municipality located in the province of Zaragoza, Aragon, Spain. According to the 2010 census the municipality has a population of 3074 inhabitants. Its postal code is 50550.
Mallén is located close to Road N-232 in the Huecha River valley, near the Ebro on its right side. Belsinon is an ancient Celtiberian archeological site located in the Cerro del Convento hillock, formerly known as Mania or Manlia, near Mallén.

Santos González Roncal, one of the "Últimos de Filipinas" soldiers at the siege of Baler was born in Mallén in 1873. He was executed by the Guardia Civil at the beginning of the Spanish Civil War, on 8 September 1936.

Tradition
According to a local tradition, the musicians of Mallén did not know how to play while walking during a religious procession. Thus a horse cart was provided and they played while they sat on the cart. Following this event, some aphorisms became part of the tradition of the surrounding towns.

See also
Campo de Borja
Burrén and Burrena

References

External links 

BFM Mallén
 Mallén Town Hall website
 Asociación Cultural Belsinon
 Villa de Mallén
 Asociación Cultural Révolté
 Mallén en Campo de Borja

Municipalities in the Province of Zaragoza
Campo de Borja